Crisnatol (BW-A770U) is an experimental anticancer agent. A Phase I clinical trial was published in 1999.

References 

Amines
Diols
Primary alcohols